Chung Fook v. White, 264 U.S. 443 (1924), was a Supreme Court case. In line with the plain meaning rule, the Court determined that a native-born citizen of the United States was not automatically entitled to rights granted by a statute for naturalized citizens, despite the doctrine of absurdity.

The proviso of § 22 of the Immigration Act of 1917 allowed for the wife of a "naturalized" citizen (who married his wife after the naturalization) to be brought over to the United States. It was argued that Chung Fook, a native-born citizen, would then be allowed to bring over his wife, as it would not make sense to give a particular right to a naturalized citizen that a native-born citizen was not permitted. The Court rejected this argument and wrote "The words of the statute being clear, if it unjustly discriminates against the native-born citizen, or is cruel and inhuman in its results, as forcefully contended, the remedy lies with Congress, and not with the courts. Their duty is simply to enforce the law as it is written, unless clearly unconstitutional."

The Court opinion was delivered by Justice Sutherland.

Background 

"Chung Fook is a native-born citizen of the United States. Lee Shee, his wife, is an alien Chinese woman, ineligible for naturalization. In 1922, she sought admission to the United States, but was refused and detained at the immigration station on the ground that she was an alien, afflicted with a dangerous contagious disease. No question is raised as to her alienage or the effect and character of her disease, but the contention is that, nevertheless, she is entitled to admission under the proviso found in § 22 of the Immigration Act of February 5, 1917, 39 Stat. 891, c. 29."

External links
 
 

1924 in United States case law
United States Supreme Court cases
United States immigration and naturalization case law
United States statutory interpretation case law
United States political question doctrine case law
Marriage law in the United States
History of San Francisco
Chinese-American history
United States Supreme Court cases of the Taft Court